Braun (German for "brown") may refer to:
Braun, surname of German origin
Braun (company), a German electronics and appliance company
B. Braun Melsungen, a German medical supplies and drugs company
Braun's Fashions, the former name of clothing retailer Christopher & Banks
Carl Braun Camera-Werk (new name Braun Photo Technik GmbH), German electronics, slide projector and camera maker
Braun Racing, a NASCAR team
 C. F. Braun, an American engineering company, designed petroleum and chemical processing facilities; acquired by KBR
BraunAbility, American manufacturer of wheelchair lifts and accessible vans, formerly known as The Braun Corporation

See also 
 Brawn (disambiguation)
 Brown (disambiguation)
 Braune
 Brauner
 Von Braun (disambiguation)